William Simmons "Lucky" Wright (February 21, 1880 – July 6, 1941) was a professional baseball pitcher. He appeared in five games in Major League Baseball for the Cleveland Naps in 1909, though he was never "Lucky" enough to win a Major League game in his career.

References

External links

Major League Baseball pitchers
Cleveland Naps players
Decatur Commodores players
Bloomington Bloomers players
Oakland Oaks (baseball) players
Toledo Mud Hens players
Minor league baseball managers
Baseball players from Ohio
1880 births
1941 deaths
People from Waterville, Ohio